SubHuman : Human Imprint is an American record label which releases dubstep and electro house music

In September 2010, Dieselboy / Damian Higgins and partner Steve Gordon / Smash Gordf style, of Steez Promo of Baltimore, Maryland, and Circle Management (based in Philadelphia, Pennsylvania), launched the SubHuman sublabel of Human Imprint for dubstep and Electro house releases.  Artists include Bare, Mark Instinct, Muffler, NumberNin6, PXL FST (Pixel Fist), and Smash Gordon.

SubHuman's May 11, 2011 "King Kong" release was the first collaboration between Bare and Datsik.

In February 2012, Higgins and Gordon launched Planet Human as the new umbrella label for Human Imprint and SubHuman with the following artist roster: Dieselboy, Smash Gordon, Bare, Hulk, Mark Instinct, Mayhem, Muffler, Nerd Rage, Nightwalker, NumbernIn6, Pixel Fist, Sluggo, Subshock, Dan Wall, Zardonic.

Discography

Singles, EPs, and free downloads

Mixes
 "Dieselboy - Live at Beta!," mix by Dieselboy, free download, April 13, 2012
 "Dieselboy - Wake the Dead!," mix by Dieselboy, free download, February 6, 2012
 "Smash Your Fucking Face Vol. 3," mix by Smash Gordon, May 6, 2011
 "Dieselboy - Unleashed!," mix by Dieselboy, free download, January 31, 2011
 "In for the Kill" - Genre Changing Smash Up - DJ Edit 320, mix by Smash Gordon, December 3, 2010
 "This is Not for Your Computer Speakers," mix by Smash Gordon, December 2010
 "Smash Your Fucking Face Vol. 2," mix by Smash Gordon, August 22, 2010
 "Smash Your Fucking Face," mix by Smash Gordon, November 14, 2009

See also
 Planet Human
 Human Imprint
 Dieselboy

Further reading
 Avalon's Notorious Questions: Dieselboy and Smash Gordon, submitted by Eduardo, 18 August 2011
 "Dieselboy Leads Dub Nation Tour" by Arielle Castillo, Broward Palm Beach New Times, December 10, 2010
 Twin Cities CityPages.com Q&A with Dieselboy by Jen Boyles, November 24, 2010
 "Champion Sounds ft. Dieselboy" (with photos by Chris Murphy), by Jenn Silver, Supreme Hustle, November21, 2010
 Muffler Interview and Mix on release of Calling Your Name/Gangwarz on dogsonacid.com, by Khal, October 11, 2010
 Lasvegasweekly.com Interview Nightlife Podcast by Deanna Rilling, April 15, 2010
 Spinner.com Interview SXSW Interview by Stefani Schwartz, March 12, 2010]

References

American independent record labels
Electronic dance music record labels
Electronic music record labels
Record labels established in 2010